Ellinair was a Greek airline headquartered in Thessaloniki operating scheduled and charter flights.

History
The new airline was established on 19 February 2013 and its first flight was operated in February 2014. The name Ellinair is a combination of the words "Έλλην" (Ellin - "Greek") and "air". 

The company waw a member of Mouzenidis Group, and it was created to serve the high volume of tourists, mainly from Russia, who visit Greece by Mouzenidis Travel. In October 2014, Ellinair flights were incorporated in all the Global Distribution Systems (GDSs) to ensure accessibility to all tourist agencies. On 15 June 2015, Ellinair launched new domestic routes from Athens and Thessaloniki.

Mouzenidis Travel ceased trading in 2021. EllinAir parked its aircraft fleet, intending to restart in 2022. In November 2021, Ellinair put plans to restart on hold, returning its aircraft to their lessors.

Destinations 
 Ellinair operated scheduled flights to 32 destinations. Ellinair mainly operated flights to Eastern Europe and Russia from its main base at Thessaloniki International Airport and from Athens International Airport with additional direct flights to international destinations from Corfu International Airport and Heraklion International Airport during the summer leisure season.

Codeshare agreements
Ellinair codeshares with the following airline:

 Aeroflot

Charter flights
During the summer season, Ellinair operated several A320s, performing charter services in association with major tour operators. The charter flights connect popular holiday destinations in Greece to Italy, Poland, Israel, Russia, Austria, Germany, Ukraine and other countries.

Fleet

As of February 2022, the Ellinair fleet consisted of the following aircraft:

Historical fleet
Other than the current aircraft, Ellinair also operated the following types:

 British Aerospace 146
 Boeing 737-300
 Boeing 737-400
 Airbus A319-100

References

External links

Official website

Defunct airlines of Greece
Airlines established in 2013
Airlines disestablished in 2021
Companies based in Thessaloniki
Greek brands
Greek companies established in 2013